Freaky Flow is the stage name of Stephen Grey a drum and bass hip hop DJ.

Biography

Life
Freaky Flow was born in 1977 as Stephen Grey in Philadelphia, Pennsylvania. In 1979 with his parents, he relocated to Toronto, Ontario, Canada. While attending high school, he began to DJ as a hobby. Eventually it developed into a career while earning a Bachelor of Arts Degree at the University of Toronto. In 2009, he moved to Los Angeles, California. He has dual citizenship in the United States and Canada.

Career 

In 1993, Freaky Flow first began DJing mainly at house parties and small events. He started his career in Toronto, Ontario, Canada.

In 1995, Freaky Flow was "introduced" at the very first Liquid Adrenaline event in Toronto, Ontario, Canada.

In 1995, Freaky Flow released his first DJ mix tape, entitled Music To Make You Freak – Volume 1. In the years that followed, Freaky Flow released seven additional mixes, in audio cassette form, prior to releasing his first CD in 1999.

In 1997, Freaky Flow launched Placebo Recordings (a subsidiary of Stickman Records) with MC Flipside, and The Stickmen. The label produced three vinyl records.

In 1999, Freaky Flow released his first DJ mix CD, entitled Obscene Underground – Volume 1: Freaky Flow (often referred to as "Tits", due to the album artwork, which bears this word on the front of it), which has sold over 20,000 units in Canada (and was not widely released outside of Canada).

In 2001, Freaky Flow was signed to Moonshine Music. That same year, he released his first mix CD outside of Canada, entitled World Domination.

In 2002, Freaky Flow released another album on Moonshine Music, entitled Keep It Live, his first ever commercially released live recording. The album is hosted by MC Flipside, and was recorded at an event in Toronto, Ontario, Canada.

In 2003, Freaky Flow released the album The Envy, on New York label, Topaz Records.

In 2004, Freaky Flow independently released another mix CD, entitled Flashback, featuring only songs that he had written, co-written, or remixed since the start of his career.

In 2006, Freaky Flow launched a new record label, Freaky Flow Recordings. That same year, the label released the debut album of the Canadian electronic music group, The Heavy Petters (often billed as Freaky Flow Presents: The Heavy Petters). The album was entitled Smell The Glove. Freaky Flow served as Executive Producer.

In 2009, Freaky Flow released the mix album The Furious Factor on New York's Moist Music, as a joint-venture with Furious Records. This album was a retrospective mix compilation made up entirely of notable releases on Toronto-based drum and bass label, Furious Records.

In 2011, Freaky Flow continued his Volume mix series (the last of which was Volume 008, several years earlier), with two new mixes, Volume 009 and Volume 010, both given away free online.

Grey has also been known to include music from other genres in his DJ sets, ranging from Fleetwood Mac to Don Henley. He is the owner of Freaky Flow Recordings (a division of Freaky Flow Entertainment Group), the record label that released the Canadian electronic music group, The Heavy Petters (often billed as "Freaky Flow Presents: The Heavy Petters").

Having released six mix CDs in total, Freaky Flow has sold more drum and bass mix albums than any other Canadian DJ. In Canada, Freaky Flow has sold more drum and bass mix albums than any other DJ from anywhere in the world, including the best-selling drum and bass mix album ever released in Canada, Obscene Underground – Volume 1: Freaky Flow (often referred to as "Tits", due to the album artwork, which bares this word on the front of it), which has sold over 20,000 units in Canada (and was not widely released outside of Canada).

Freaky Flow has performed in over ten countries, including Canada, the United States, Japan, Slovenia, and others. He is also currently sponsored by gsus sindustries, a clothing company, and represented by the Cyber Groove agency, a DJ booking agency.

Discography

Albums 
 Obscene Underground – Volume 1: Freaky Flow – Stickman Records (1999)
 World Domination – Moonshine Music (2001)
 Keep It Live – Moonshine Music (2002)
 The Envy – Topaz Records (2003)
 Flashback – Freaky Flow Productions (2004)
 The Furious Factor – Moist Music (2009)

Singles 
 On The Down Low / Mist – Placebo Recordings (1997)
 The Swinger / Here We Go – Wikkid Records (2005)

Remixes 
 What It Takes (Remix) / Just A Second (Remix) – Placebo Recordings (1997)
 Compare / Compare (Remix) – Second Generation (2001)
 Doubt Love / Doubt Love (Remix) – Sound Gizmo Audio (2003)

References

External links 
 Freaky Flow website

Date of birth missing (living people)
1977 births
Living people
Musicians from Philadelphia
American drum and bass musicians
Canadian DJs
American DJs
Remixers
Musicians from Toronto
Electronic dance music DJs